Henri Biva (23 January 1848 – 2 February 1929) was a French artist, known for his landscape paintings and still lifes. He focused primarily on the western suburbs of Paris, painting outdoors in the plein-air tradition; his style ranging between Post-Impressionism and Realism with a strong Naturalist component. Biva's pictures are characterized by intricate strokes and a pure palette bathed with warm natural light (Biva devoted great attention to light effects). The artist was a member of the Société des Artistes Français and a Knight of the Legion of Honour (Chevalier de la Légion d'Honneur).

Early life
Henri Biva was born in Montmartre at 18 rue du Vieux Chemin de Paris (named rue Ravignan after 1867). His official date of birth is 22 January 1848. He grew up in an artistic environment, both within his own family and in the neighborhood in which he lived. His younger brother Paul Biva (1851–1900) also became a painter, as would Henri Biva's son Lucien Biva (1878–1965).

In 1873 Biva studied at the École des Beaux-Arts in Paris, where many famous artists in Europe were trained. His teachers included Léon Tanzi (1846–1913), an esteemed Realist painter, and Alexandre Nozal (1852–1929) a respected landscape artist that perambulated from Impressionism to Post-Impressionism. A trace of both instructors can be contemplated in Biva's work. This, in addition to the lessons at l'Académie Julian with William-Adolphe Bouguereau, Jean-Joseph Benjamin-Constant and Jules Joseph Lefebvre, would ultimately propel Henri Biva to the fore as a career artist. These combined influences explain the skillfully controlled artistry of Henri Biva. The Académie had a very strict and rigorous philosophy toward paintings, yet throughout its history many artists that studied there from 1868 onwards had initiated new artistic movements, or were involved to some extent within them, as was the case of Biva.

Shortly thereafter, during the latter half of the 1870s, Henri Biva began showing his works in the Parisian salon's, while enjoying sufficient commercial success to make his living.

Painting career

At the Salon de 1879 (which opened on 12 May in Paris at the Palais des Champs-Élysées) Biva exhibited two paintings: Les roses du parc and Pavillon d'été du Chateau de Villeneuve-l'Étang, numbers 293 and 294 in the catalogue.

Janet Whitmore writes of Biva's work, something that could apply to many of his paintings:

"Like the naturalist painters such as Jules Bastien-Lepage or Rosa Bonheur, there is a strong tactile quality to Biva's work, focused on the shapes, colors and forms of the small plants beside the stream or the smooth grey surface of the tree trunks.

Equally important in the nineteenth-century marketplace, this type of landscape painting offered an intimate glimpse of a specific locale, a reminder of days spent in the French countryside, or perhaps at the immense forest preserves surrounding Paris. Unlike contemporaries such as Pissarro or Monet, Biva's landscapes suggest a time before industrialization when no railroad or factory disrupted rural vistas. Rather, these images show no evidence of human activity at all except for the occasional fisherman drowsing by the riverside."

With his style ranging between Post-Impressionism and Realism, with a pronounced Naturalist temperament—visible in Villeneuve-l'étang (soir) and Après le coucher du soleil—the paintings of Henri Biva gained in popularity amongst private collectors and public institutions.

"Although Biva's career seems to have flourished during the 1880s," writes Janet Whitmore, "he received particular acclaim in the 1890s beginning with his first honorable mention at the Salon des Artistes Français in 1892 when his work as a painter of landscapes and flowers was especially noted. Three years later, in 1895, he received a third class medal, and in 1896, a second class medal. With this third award in place, he was no longer obligated to submit his work to the annual jury for acceptance, but instead was guaranteed an automatic position at the Salon."

"The turn of the century brought Biva continued success and public renown. His landscapes and flower paintings, still widely sought after by art collectors, gradually evolved into more meditative images."

In 1886 Biva exhibited three works, including Une rue de Ville-d'Avray, La Nuit, at the Exposition Internationale de Blanc et Noir (Louvre, Pavillon de l'enseignement, Rue des Tuileries, Paris, 20 March-20 April 1886). Biva's was awarded the Médaille de bronze at the Exposition Universelle (1900), inviting the attention of the Purchasing Committee, while his teacher Alexandre Nozal was awarded the silver medal.

Upon recommendation of Le Ministre de l'Instruction Publique et des Beaux-Arts, 11 August 1900, Biva was decorated Chevalier de l'Ordre de la Légion d'Honneur, 29 November 1900, and breveted by the Grand Chancelier, 12 December of the same year.

This honorable accomplishment appears to have stimulated further commercial success in the years leading up to World War I. Following the war years, Biva's sales rebounded as he continued exhibiting paintings throughout the 1920s.

Biva exhibited his painting in the Salons des Artistes Francais, Paris, in 1900, 1903, 1904 and 1905. In 1923 Henri Biva was elected vice-president of the Salon d'Hiver (Winter Salon), founded in 1897, first exhibition 1904.

Biva continued to show regularly in Paris, with a conspicuous break during World War I (most of the Salons being closed for the duration 1914-1918). Some of Biva's documented exhibitions include: Salon 1905, Salon 1906, Salon 1908 (Société Lyonnaise des Beaux-Arts), Salon 1909, Salon des Artistes Français 1910, Salon d'Hiver 1910, Salon 1911, Salon d'Hiver 1911, Salon des Artistes Français 1912, Salon 1919, Salon 1921, Salon d'Hiver 1923, Le Salon 1928 Grand Palais des Champs-Elysées, Société des Artistes Français (the year before his death).

According to his death certificate (avis de décès), Biva died 2 February 1929 at his home in Paris, 72 rue du Château-d'Eau.

Selected works
 Matin à Villeneuve (From Waters Edge), 151.1 x 125.1 cm
 The woodland Pool, 155 x 129.5 cm
 Près de la rivière, 122 x 162 cm
 Au bord de la rivière ensoleillé (By the river), 53.3 x 59.7 cm
 Un coin tranquille, 50 x 61 cm
 Le Matin dans la brume à Villeneuve-l'Etang
 Après le coucher du soleil, 142.5 x 193 cm
 Les brumes et rosées du matin Villeneuve l'étang
 A woodland pond, 110.4 x 140.3 cm
 A Summer's day on the lake, 46.3 x 55.3 cm
 Attributed to Henri Biva, Fishing on a sunny afternoon, 100.4 x 77.5 cm
 Punts moored on still waters, 61 x 50 cm
 Paysage avec rivière, 50 x 61 cm
 A sun drenched river view, 64.8 x 54 cm
 Tranquility, 61 by 74 cm
 A woodland pond, 50.2 x 61 cm
 Au bord du lac, 65 x 81 cm
 La rivière, 61.5 x 50.5 cm
 The quite lake, 65.5 x 82 cm
 Rivière en sous bois, 61 x 50.5 cm
 Les nénuphars, 82 x 65 cm
 Paysage de rivière, 66 x 54 cm
 L'allée fleurie, 72.4 x 92.1 cm
 Summer on the river bank, 46 x 34 cm
 Lake scene, 60 x 73 cm

Gallery

Notes

References

Museums and institutions
 
 Musée municipal, Loire-Atlantique; Saint-Nazaire (L'après-midi à Villeneuve-l'Etang ) dat de l'acte 1907
 Musée, Loire; Roanne (Nature Morte)
 Paris, agence photo RMN, fonds Druet-Vizzavona, Paris (Les brumes et rosées du matin; Villeneuve-l'étang, exposé au Salon des Artistes Français de 1907)
 Musée du Luxembourg, Paris, Les brumes, Villeneuve-l'Etang, 1909

External links

 Villeneuve-l"Etang, postcards
 Réunion des musées nationaux, Grand Palais, Agence Photographique
 Sotheby's, New York, 24 October, 2006, lot 249, Henri Biva, A woodland pond, oil on canvas 
 Sotheby's, New York, 28 January, 2006, lot 165, Henri Biva, By the river, oil on canvas 

 
1848 births
1929 deaths
Artists from Paris
French landscape painters
French still life painters
Post-Impressionist artists
Impressionist artists
Modern painters
Realist artists
French naturalists
19th-century French painters
19th-century French male artists
French male painters
20th-century French painters
20th-century French male artists
Chevaliers of the Légion d'honneur
People of Montmartre